The Yazgulyam language (also Yazgulami, Yazgulyami, Iazgulem, Yazgulam, Yazgulyamskiy, Jazguljamskij, Qzgulqmskij) is a member of the Southeastern subgroup of the Iranian languages, spoken by around 9,000 people along the Yazgulyam River in Gorno-Badakhshan, Tajikistan. Together with Shugni, it is classified in a Shugni-Yazgulami subgroup of the areal group of Pamir languages. Virtually all speakers are bilingual in the Tajik language.

The Yazgulyam people are an exception among the speakers of Pamir languages in that they do not adhere to Ismailism.

Dialects 
The Yazgulami language consists of two dialects: one of these is spoken higher in the mountains, the other lower. The differences are not significant and are limited to the vocabulary. Differences in the vocabulary are also detectable between the languages used in different villages in the lower mountains. The extinct Vanji language (also Vanži) is closely related to Yazgulami. Other languages spoken in the Pamirs differ greatly from the Yazgulami language. The disparities are the largest in the vocabulary.

History 
The language was first recorded by Russian traveller G. Arandarenko in 1889, listing 34 Yazgulami words recorded in 1882. The language was described in greater detail by French linguist Robert Gauthiot in Notes sur le yazggoulami, dialecte iranien des Confins du Pamir (1916).

In 1954 the Yazgulami living on the mountain slopes were resettled, about 20% of them forcibly, to the Vakhsh valley, where they live dispersed among the Tajiks, Uzbeks, Russians and other ethnic groups.

Phonology
The phonology of the Yazgulyam language differs from the basic "Shugni-Roshani" type in its system of dorsal consonants: in addition to the velar and uvular stops g, k, q and fricatives x̌, γ̌, x, γ,, Yazgulami has a palatalised and a labialised series, transcribed as ḱ, ǵ (palatalised velars), k° g° x̌° (labialised velars, there is no labialised velar voiced fricative) and q° x° γ° (labialised uvulars). A significant number of labialised consonants etymologically correspond to Proto-Iranian *Cv or *Cu, e.g. x̌°arg < *hvaharā- "sister", while others are unrelated to Proto-Iranian v, e.g. sk°on < skana- "puppy".

This threefold system of articulation of dorsals has been compared typologically to the three reconstructed rows of dorsals in the Proto-Indo-European language.

Morphology
In the past tense, Yazgulyam has tripartite marking—one of the very few languages in the world to have it at all. This means that the subject of an intransitive sentence is treated differently from both the subject and the object of a transitive sentence.

Literature
Ėdel’man, D.I. Jazguljamskij jazyk. Moskva: Nauka, 1966.
Ėdel’man, D.I. Jazguljamsko-russkij slovar’. Moskva: Nauka, 1971.
Zarubin, I.I. Two Yazghulāmī Texts. Bulletin of the School of Oriental Studies, University of London, 1936, vol. 8, no. 2/3, p. 875-881.
Payne, John, "Pamir languages" in: Rüdiger Schmitt (ed.), Compendium Linguarum Iranicarum, 417–444. Wiesbaden: Reichert, 1989.

References

External links
Eki.ee/books/redbook/yazgulamis/shtml
Christusrex.org
A Short List of Yazghulami Words
English-Ishkashimi- Zebaki-Wakhi-Yazghulami Vocabulary
 Grierson G. A. Ishkashmi, Zebaki, and Yazghulami, an account of three Eranian dialects. (1920)  

Pamir languages
Eastern Iranian languages
Languages of Tajikistan
Endangered Iranian languages